Mario Gios (born 7 May 1936) is an Italian speed skater. He competed in four events at the 1960 Winter Olympics.

References

External links
 

1936 births
Living people
Italian male speed skaters
Olympic speed skaters of Italy
Speed skaters at the 1960 Winter Olympics
People from Asiago
Sportspeople from the Province of Vicenza